Silvia Cristina Gustavo Rocha (born 1982) is a Brazilian female basketball player. At the 2012 Summer Olympics, she competed for the Brazil women's national basketball team in the women's event.

References

1982 births
Living people
Brazilian women's basketball players
Olympic basketball players of Brazil
Basketball players at the 2012 Summer Olympics